Serra de la Vall de la Torre, also known as Serra de la Vall, is a mountain range located at the southern end of the Catalan Pre-Coastal Range, Catalonia, Spain.
The ridge's highest point is 450.8 m. This mountain range lies within the Benissanet and Corbera d'Ebre municipal term. It is a smaller and lower northern prolongation of the Serra de Cavalls. 

In the valley formed between this range and the Serra de Cavalls there is an ancient castle known as Torre de la Vall.

Recent history
These mountains, along with Serra de Pàndols and Serra de Cavalls further south, as well as the Serra de la Fatarella in the north, were the scenario of bloody battles during the Battle of the Ebro in the Spanish Civil War (1936 - 39). The Ebro Battle was also the last action of the International Brigades, who were withdrawn midway through it.

See also
Siege of Gandesa (1938) 
International Brigades
Catalan Pre-Coastal Range

References

Bibliography
Jaume Aguadé i Sordé, El diari de guerra de Lluís Randé i Inglés; Batalles del Segre i de l’Ebre i camps de concentració (abril 1938 - juliol 1939), El Tinter

External links
La Serra de Cavalls i la Vall de la Torre
La Batalla de l'Ebre 

Military history of Catalonia
Cavalls